Samir Nouioua (born 10 July 1985) is a Paralympian athlete from Algeria competing mainly in category T46 middle-distance events.

He competed in the 2004 Summer Paralympics in Athens, Greece.  There he won a gold medal in the men's 1500 metres - T46 event, a gold medal in the men's 5000 metres - T46 event and a silver medal in the men's 800 metres - T46 event.  He also competed at the 2008 Summer Paralympics in Beijing, China.    There he won a silver medal in the men's 800 metres - T46 event and a bronze medal in the men's 1500 metres - T46 event

Achievements

External links
 

Paralympic athletes of Algeria
Athletes (track and field) at the 2004 Summer Paralympics
Athletes (track and field) at the 2008 Summer Paralympics
Athletes (track and field) at the 2012 Summer Paralympics
Athletes (track and field) at the 2016 Summer Paralympics
Paralympic gold medalists for Algeria
Paralympic silver medalists for Algeria
Paralympic bronze medalists for Algeria
1985 births
Living people
Medalists at the 2004 Summer Paralympics
Medalists at the 2008 Summer Paralympics
Medalists at the 2012 Summer Paralympics
Medalists at the 2016 Summer Paralympics
Paralympic medalists in athletics (track and field)
21st-century Algerian people
Algerian male middle-distance runners
20th-century Algerian people